The 1965 VFL Golden Fleece Night Premiership was the Victorian Football League end of season cup competition played in September of the 1965 VFL Premiership Season. Run as a knock-out tournament, it was contested by the eight VFL teams that failed to make the 1965 VFL finals series. It was the tenth VFL Night Series competition. Games were played at the Lake Oval, Albert Park, then the home ground of South Melbourne, as it was the only ground equipped to host night games. This was the first time the Night Series cup had a naming rights sponsor in Golden Fleece petroleum products. North Melbourne won its first night series cup defeating Carlton in the final by 40 points.

Games

Round 1

|- bgcolor="#CCCCFF"
| Winning team
| Winning team score
| Losing team
| Losing team score
| Ground
| Crowd
| Date
|- bgcolor="#FFFFFF"
| 
| 21.10 (136)
| 
| 8.12 (60)
| Lake Oval
| 23,500
| Thursday, 2 September
|- bgcolor="#FFFFFF"
| 
| 18.14 (122)
| 
| 8.9 (57)
| Lake Oval
| 19,500
| Tuesday, 7 September
|- bgcolor="#FFFFFF"
| 
| 9.25 (79)
| 
| 9.10 (64)
| Lake Oval
| 19,725
| Thursday, 9 September
|- bgcolor="#FFFFFF"
| 
| 13.12 (90)
| 
| 9.12 (66)
| Lake Oval
| 15,880
| Tuesday, 14 September

Semi-finals

|- bgcolor="#CCCCFF"
| Winning team
| Winning team score
| Losing team
| Losing team score
| Ground
| Crowd
| Date
|- bgcolor="#FFFFFF"
| 
| 14.15 (99)
| 
| 5.10 (40)
| Lake Oval
| 23,730
| Thursday, 16 September
|- bgcolor="#FFFFFF"
| 
| 13.10 (88)
| 
| 6.10 (46)
| Lake Oval
| 13,550
| Tuesday, 21 September

Final

|- bgcolor="#CCCCFF"
| Winning team
| Winning team score
| Losing team
| Losing team score
| Ground
| Crowd
| Date
|- bgcolor="#FFFFFF"
| 
| 14.13 (97)
| 
| 9.3 (57)
| Lake Oval
| 37,750
| Monday, 27 September

See also

List of Australian Football League night premiers
1965 VFL season

External links
 1965 VFL Night Premiership - detailed review including quarter-by-quarter scores, best players and goalkickers for each match

Australian Football League pre-season competition